The Global T20 Canada is a 20-over cricket tournament played in Canada. The first edition of the tournament took place during June and July 2018 with six teams competing. Each team featured four local Canadian cricketers in each squad, along with international players. The inaugural tournament in 2018 took place at the Maple Leaf Cricket Club in King City, Ontario, while the 2019 tournament took place at the CAA Centre in Brampton, Ontario. Bombay Sports Limited are the owners of the league, and also the organizers of the Euro T20 Slam that was set to begin on August 30, 2019.

History
The International Cricket Council (ICC) sanctioned the tournament in February 2018, and it is the first fully sanctioned T20 league in North America outside of the Caribbean. Canada's Prime Minister, Justin Trudeau, was pleased with the ICC's decision to approve the league.

In May 2018, Cricket Canada announced that the inaugural edition of the tournament would start on 28 June, with the final being held on 15 July 2018. Vancouver Knights won the tournament, beating Cricket West Indies B Team by seven wickets in the final.

The 2019 league began on 25 July, with the final match taking place on 11 August. The second-round game between Montreal Tigers and Toronto Nationals on August 7, 2019, was delayed for two hours in a protest over unpaid wages; some pay issues date back to the 2018 tournament. The protest occurred even though Toronto Nationals captain Yuvraj Singh's fundraiser for his YouWeCan Foundation, had been hosted two days earlier by League organizers.

The third season of the tournament, scheduled to be held in 2020, was postponed due to the COVID-19 pandemic to 2021. Originally planned to be played at the CAA Centre, Brampton, Ontario, Canada, it was later announced that it would be held from 24 June to 11 July 2021 in Kuala Lumpur, Malaysia due to ongoing pandemic restrictions in Canada. Edmonton Royals were renamed as Surrey Jaguars.  The 2021 tournament was ultimately cancelled "due to evolving concerns regarding COVID-19 and strict preventive measures taken by the Government of Malaysia to contain the spread of the pandemic."

Teams

Current

Former

Results

Media 
Mediapro was appointed as "global consultant" for Global T20 Canada's media rights in 2019, handling aspects of world feed production and international distribution via its various regional subsidiaries. Locally, the tournament's broadcast rights are split between Asian Television Network and TSN.

References

 
Twenty20 cricket leagues
Recurring sporting events established in 2018
Canadian domestic cricket competitions
2018 establishments in Canada
Sport in King, Ontario
Professional cricket leagues
Professional sports leagues in Canada